Cyperus nudiceps is a species of flowering plant in the family Cyperaceae, only found on Cocos Island. It was first described as Kyllinga nudiceps in 1929 and transferred to Cyperus in 1944.

See also
List of Cyperus species

References

nudiceps
Flora of the Central American Pacific Islands
Plants described in 1929